Fontaine is a Charleroi Metro station, located in Fontaine-l'Évêque, in fare zone 7. It is an underground station featuring a central platform with street access at its western end.

The station has been refurbished in 2009-2010 and its current version was inaugurated on 16 June 2010. The interior decoration, made of colored castle-like shapes on a white background, is a work of architect Ingrid Lange.

Nearby points of interest 

The station is located in the center of Fontaine-l'Évêque.

Transfers 

TEC Charleroi bus lines 63 and 173.

References 

Charleroi Metro stations
Railway stations opened in 1992